Oenides is a genus of skippers in the family Hesperiidae. It is monotypic, being represented by the single species Oenides vulpina.

References

Hesperiidae
Monotypic butterfly genera